St. John Brebeuf Catholic Church is a parish in the Archdiocese of Chicago, located in Niles, Illinois.

St. John Brebeuf Church was founded in 1953 and was the first Catholic parish in Niles.  The current church building was completed in 1966.  The church is named in honor of Saint Jean de Brébeuf.

Parish School 
The St. John Brebeuf parish school educates children from pre-school through eighth grade.

References

External links 
St. John Brebeuf School Official Website

 Roman Catholic churches completed in 1966
 Catholic elementary schools in Illinois
 Private elementary schools in Cook County, Illinois
 Churches in the Roman Catholic Archdiocese of Chicago
 Churches in Cook County, Illinois
20th-century Roman Catholic church buildings in the United States